Authorised Neutral Athletes from Russia competed at the 2019 World Athletics Championships in Doha, Qatar, from 27 September to 6 October 2019. They were represented by 29 athletes.

Medalists

Results

Men
Track and road events

Field events

Combined events – Decathlon

Women 

Track and road events

Field events

References

Nations at the 2019 World Athletics Championships
World Championships in Athletics
2019